Kiziloy Township (قىزىلئۆي يېزىسى / Heiziwei ) is the former county seat before 1989 and a township of Wuqia County in Xinjiang Uygur Autonomous Region, China. Located in the middle of the county, the township covers an area of 2,782.4 square kilometers with a population of 6,899 (as of 2017). It has 6 administrative villages under its jurisdiction. Its seat is at Kiziloy .

Kiziloy is located 5 kilometers away southwest of the county seat Wuqia Town. It is adjacent to Baykurut Township in the east, Shufu County in the south, Toyun Township in the northeast and Ulugqat Township in the northwest.

Name
The name Kiziloy is from the Kyrgyz language and means "red depression" or "basin", where 'kizil' ('heizi') means 'red' and 'oy' ('wei') means 'depression' or 'basin'. Other nearby places with the word 'kizil' (red) in their names include Kizilsu, Kizil Caves, and Kizilto.

On a Qing Dynasty map of Shufu County, the Kiziloy area is labeled Hezi'ayi.

History
Kiziloy was part of the 1st district	 in Wuqia County in 1950 and Kiziloy Commune   was formed in 1958, it was renamed Dongfanghong Commune  in 1968 and restored the original name in 1980, and organized as a township in 1984.

Overview

The township's seat is at 2,500 meters above sea level. The average elevation of the township is above 3,000 meters. The highest altitude is 4,000 meters. The altitude of each pasture point is 3000–4000 meters. More than 98% are Gobi desert and saline-alkali land. The local climate is extremely harsh, the winter is cold and long, the heating time is up to 6 months per year, and the lowest temperature in winter is as low as minus 6 degrees Celsius. The summer is cool and short, the highest temperature is about 25 degrees, there are many windy weather, frequent mountain flood disasters, and the annual average temperature is less than 6 °C. The terrain is cut in depth, the north is high and south low.

The width of east and west is 78 kilometers, and the north and south are 86 kilometers long. The total area of the township is 2,782.4 square kilometers, of which the grassland area is 1,693 square kilometers, the forest area is 120.13 hectares, and the cultivated area is 625.13 hectares. There are 6 villages and 25 village groups. There are a total of 2,604 households with a population of 6,899, of which, Kyrgyz of 5,201, Han of 1,067, Uyghur peoples of 5,90 and the other ethnic groups of 41.

Settlements
The township has a residential community, 6 administration villages and 16  unincorporated villages under its jurisdiction.

1 community:
 Aybulak Community (Ayibulake)

6 administration villages:
 Arabulak Village (Arebulake)
 Ekiterak Village (Yeketiereke, Yeketie Rekecun) 
 Jangir Village (Jiangji'er)
 Kanjgan Village ( / Kanjiugan, Kanjiugancun) 
 Kengxiwar Village ( / Kangshiwei'er, Kangshiwei'ercun) 
 Kolerik Village (Kule'arike)

Demographics

, the population of Kiziloy was 72.4% Kyrgyz. The Heiziwei subgroup of Kyrgyz people speak the Heiziwei dialect of Northern Kyrgyz.

Economy
Economic activities in Kiziloy include flour processing and other small scale industries as well as mining of celestine, gypsum, red clay, lead and zinc. Groundwater resources are abundant.

Transportation
 G3013 Kashgar–Erkeshtam Expressway

Notes

References

External links
 新疆乌恰县黑孜苇乡柯尔克孜族宗教信仰调查 (Kirghiz Religious Belief Investigation in Kiziloy Township, Ulugqat County, Xinjiang) in journal Xiyu Yanjiu (西域研究) (2004) 

Township-level divisions of Wuqia County